XEE may refer to:

XML external entity attack, a web security exploit
Xee, a Danish television station, since rebranded as See
XEE-AM, a Mexican radio station
XEE (Starlight), a data processing language
A version of Evangelism Explosion designed for younger people
 Xee³, an image viewer for Mac OS X platform